Halae or Halai was a town of ancient Locris, situated upon the Opuntian Gulf, but belonging to Boeotia in the time of Strabo and Pausanias. It is described by Pausanias as situated to the right of the Platanias River, and as the last town of Boeotia. It probably derived its name from some salt springs which are still found in its neighbourhood.

Its site is located near modern Theologos, where some ruins exist near the church of St. John.

References

Populated places in ancient Boeotia
Populated places in Opuntian Locris
Former populated places in Greece
Archaeological sites in Greece